In mathematics, specifically abstract algebra, the opposite of a ring is another ring with the same elements and addition operation, but with the multiplication performed in the reverse order. They also help clarify the relationship between left and right modules (see ).

Monoids, groups, rings, and algebras can all be viewed as categories with a single object. The construction of the opposite category generalizes the opposite group, opposite ring, etc.

Relation to automorphisms and antiautomorphisms 
In this section the symbol for multiplication in the opposite ring is changed from asterisk to diamond, to avoid confusion with some unary operation.
All commutative rings are self-opposite.
Let us define the antiisomorphism
It is indeed an antiisomorphism, since .
The antiisomorphism  can be defined generally for semigroups, monoids, groups, rings, rngs, algebras. In case of rings (and rngs) we obtain the general equivalence.

A ring is self-opposite if and only if it has at least one antiautomorphism.

Proof:
: Let  be self-opposite.
: If  is an antiautomorphism, then  is an isomorphism as a composition of two antiisomorphisms. So  is self-opposite.

and

If  is self-opposite and the group of automorphisms  is finite, then the number of antiautomorphisms equals the number of automorphisms.

Proof: By the assumption and the above equivalence there exist antiautomorphisms.

If some antiautomorphism  is also an automorphism, then for each 

By contraposition, if a ring is noncommutative (and self-opposite), then no antiautomorphism is an automorphism.
Denote by  the group of all automorphisms together with all antiautomorphisms. The above remarks imply, that  if a ring (or rng) is noncommutative and self-opposite. If it is commutative or non-self-opposite, then .

Examples

The smallest noncommutative ring with unity 
The smallest such ring  has eight elements and it is the only noncommutative ring among 11 rings with unity of order 8, up to isomorphism. It has the additive group .

To prove that the two rings are isomorphic, take a map  given by the table

Next, rearrange rows and columns to bring the arguments back to ascending order. Similar changes in the table of additive group yield the same table, so  is an automorphism of this group, and since , it is indeed a ring isomorphism.
The map is involutory, i.e.
So, the permutation  can be reinterpreted to define isomorphism  and then  is an antiautomorphism of  given by the same permutation .
So its full group  has four elements with two of them antiautomorphisms.

There is no element of order 4, so the group is not cyclic and must be the group  (or the Klein group ), which can be confirmed by calculation. The "symmetry group" of this ring is isomorphic to the symmetry group of rectangle.

Noncommutative ring with 27 elements 
The ring of the upper triangular 2 x 2 matrices over the field with 3 elements   has 27 elements and is a noncommutative ring. It is unique up to isomorphism, that is, all noncommutative rings with unity and 27 elements are isomorphic to it. The largest noncommutative ring  listed in the "Book of the Rings" has 27 elements,  and is also isomorphic.
The group of all automorphisms  has 6 elements:

Since  is self-opposite, it has also 6 antiautomorphisms.
One isomorphism  is 
which can be verified using the tables of operations in "The Book" like in the first example by renaming and rearranging.
Thus, one antiautomorphism

is given by the same permutation. The other five can be calculated (in the multiplicative notation the composition symbol  can be dropped):

The group  has 7 elements of order 2 (3 automorphisms and 4 antiautomorphisms) and can be identified as the dihedral group  (see List of small groups).

The smallest non-self-opposite rings with unity 
All the rings with unity of orders ranging from 9 up to 15 are commutative, so they are self-opposite. The rings, that are not self-opposite, appear for the first time among the rings of order 16. There are 4 different non-self-opposite rings out of the total number of 50 rings with unity having 16 elements (37 commutative and 13 noncommutative). They can be coupled in two pairs of rings opposite to each other in a pair, and necessarily with the same additive group, since an antiisomorphism of rings is an isomorphism of their additive groups.
Their tables of operations are not presented in this article, as they can be found in the source cited, and it can be verified that , they are opposite, but not isomorphic.
The remaining 13−4=9 noncommutative rings are self-opposite.

Free algebra with two generators 
The free algebra  over a field  with generators  has multiplication from the multiplication of words. For example,

Then the opposite algebra has multiplication given by

which are not equal elements.

Quaternion algebra 

All elements  are of the form
, where 

For example, if , then  is the usual quaternion algebra.

{| class="wikitable" style="text-align: center"
|+
!
!
!
!
|-
!
|
|
|
|-
!
|
|
|
|-
!
|
|
|
|}

Then the opposite algebra  with multiplication denoted  has the table

{| class="wikitable" style="text-align: center"
|+
!
!
!
!
|-
!
|
|
|
|-
!
|
|
|
|-
!
|
|
|
|}

Commutative ring 
They are even equal , since their operations are equal, i.e. .

Properties
 Two rings R1 and R2 are isomorphic if and only if their corresponding opposite rings are isomorphic.
 A ring and its opposite ring are anti-isomorphic.
 A ring is commutative if and only if its operation coincides with its opposite operation.
 The left ideals of a ring are the right ideals of its opposite.
 The opposite ring of a division ring is a division ring.
 A left module over a ring is a right module over its opposite, and vice versa.

Notes

Citations

References

See also 
 Opposite group
 Opposite category
Ring theory